A Taste for Blue Ribbons is an Australian television series which first screened on the ABC in 1973. It was followed by a sequel television series in 1975 called Lucky Colour Blue.

Cast
 John Williams	
 Sheila Bradley		
 Sally Conabere		
 Syd Conabere		
 Ron Graham
 Gary Gray

References

External links

Australian drama television series
English-language television shows
1973 Australian television series debuts
1973 Australian television series endings
Australian Broadcasting Corporation original programming